MTV Top 100 Hits of 2008 is the TV show that aired in December 2008 on channel MTVAsia. It showed 100 songs that were most voted in 2008. On Monday thru Friday, it showed 5 songs. On Saturday and Sunday, it showed the 25 songs that were shown during that week.

Chart

MTV